Stigmella johanssonella is a moth of the family Nepticulidae. It is found from Austria and Bulgaria to Italy and Greece.

The larvae feed on Ostrya carpinifolia. They mine the leaves of their host plant. The mine consists of a slender gallery with a broad central frass line. The last part of the corridor follows a side vein.

References

Nepticulidae
Moths described in 1997
Moths of Europe